Xenolea tomentosa is a species of beetle in the family Cerambycidae. It was described by Francis Polkinghorne Pascoe in 1864. It is known from Singapore, Malaysia, Andaman Islands, and Sumatra.

References

Lamiinae
Beetles described in 1864